The 2021 Individual Long Track World Championship is the 51st edition of the FIM speedway Individual Long Track World Championship.

The Championship will be decided by a series of five Grand Prix races. Once again the schedule was seriously disrupted due to the COVID-19 pandemic, as it had been during the 2020 Individual Long Track World Championship.

Romano Hummel of the Netherlands won the world Championship title after securing 13 points in round two. Dimitri Bergé who led after round 1, was unable to ride in round 2 because he had been a wildcard in round 1. The Frenchman was denied the chance of a title shot, which was extremely unfortunate. The second and final round was streamed live on YouTube.

Venues

Final Classification

References 

Individual Long Track World Championship
Individual Long Track World Championship
2021 in French motorsport
2021 in Polish sport